Viorel Firu Smarandache (2 July 1953 – 15 December 2018) was a Romanian footballer who played as a defender.

International career
Viorel Smarandache played one friendly game for Romania, being used by coach Gheorghe Ola in a 2–2 against Peru.

Honours
Steaua Bucureşti
Divizia A: 1975–76
Cupa României: 1975–76
Olimpia Satu Mare
Divizia B: 1976–77
Cupa României runner-up: 1977–78
Electroputere Craiova
Divizia C: 1984–85

Notes

References

External links

Viorel Smarandache at Labtof.ro

1953 births
2018 deaths
Romanian footballers
Romania under-21 international footballers
Romania international footballers
Association football defenders
Liga I players
Liga II players
Liga III players
CS Universitatea Craiova players
FC Steaua București players
FC Olimpia Satu Mare players
FC Gloria Buzău players